Jize County is a county of southern Hebei province, China.

Administrative divisions
There are 3 towns and 4 townships under the county's administration.

Towns:
Jize, Xiaozhai, Shuangta

Townships:
Fengzheng Township, Wuguanying Township, Futudian Township, Caozhuang Township

Climate

References

External links

County-level divisions of Hebei
Handan